Andrea Nolan  is Professor of Veterinary Pharmacology and Principal & Vice Chancellor of Edinburgh Napier University. In 1999, she was the first woman ever appointed to head a British veterinary school.

Early life
After completing secondary education at Manor House School, Raheny, Nolan studied veterinary medicine at Trinity College Dublin.  After a brief period with a veterinary practice, she undertook postgraduate study at the universities of Bristol and Cambridge and the Technical University of Munich.

Career
Nolan was appointed a lecturer at the University of Glasgow in 1989 and Professor of Veterinary Pharmacology in 1998. She continues to hold the latter post and remains active in research focused on pain in animals. Nolan further pursued advanced clinical training, and received a diploma from the Royal College of Veterinary Surgeons, as well as recognition from the European College of Veterinary Pharmacology and Toxicology, and the European College of Veterinary Anaesthesia.

In 1999, she was appointed Dean of the Faculty of Veterinary Medicine, the first female Dean at the University and the first woman to lead a British vet school.

Vice-Principal
In 2004, she was appointed Vice-Principal of the University with responsibility for Learning & Teaching, and in 2006 took on additional responsibility for Internationalisation. At the same time, Anton Muscatelli, Dean of the Faculty of Social Sciences, was appointed Vice-Principal for Strategy, Budgeting and Advancement. In 2009, Muscatelli was appointed Principal of the University and shortly afterwards promoted Nolan to the new post of Senior Vice-Principal and Deputy Vice-Chancellor; Frank Coton, Dean of the Faculty of Engineering, was appointed Vice-Principal for Learning & Teaching. In her new role, Nolan had particular responsibility for restructuring the University's nine Faculties into four new Colleges.

Principal & Vice Chancellor
Nolan was appointed Principal & Vice Chancellor of Edinburgh Napier University in 2013, succeeding Dame Joan Stringer to the post, and announced plans for a new University strategy for 2014–2019.

Other roles
Nolan is, as of 2021, Chair of the Interface Strategic Board and a board member or trustee of Medical Research Scotland, the Universities and Colleges Employers Association, the Moredun Foundation and the Universities Federation for Animal Welfare. She is Convenor of the International Committee of Universities Scotland and she also serves as the organisation's Lead Member for Gender-Based Violence.

Nolan was previously Chair of the Scottish Higher Education Enhancement Committee, part of the Quality Assurance Agency for Higher Education, Convenor of Universities Scotland, the representative body for third-level institutions in Scotland, and a trustee of Higher Education Statistics Agency and Glasgow International College - a partnership between the University of Glasgow and Kaplan International Pathways. She was a member of the World Small Animal Veterinary Association’s Global Pain Council

Recognition
Nolan has received awards including the Pfizer Academic Award for Animal Health Research, the British Small Animal Veterinary Association's Amoroso Award and, with collaborators, the Universities Federation for Animal Welfare Companion Animal Award for contributions to animal welfare.

She is a Fellow of the Royal Society of Edinburgh and of the Royal Agricultural Societies, and an honorary life member of the Association for Veterinary Teachers & Research Workers.  

In 2014 Nolan was awarded an honorary OBE for her contributions to science.

External links
 Edinburgh Napier University – About the Principal & Vice Chancellor

References

Year of birth missing (living people)
People from Dublin (city) in health professions
20th-century Irish women scientists
People educated at Manor House School, Raheny
Alumni of Trinity College Dublin
Women veterinarians
Irish veterinarians
Alumni of the University of Bristol
Alumni of the University of Cambridge
Technical University of Munich alumni
21st-century Irish women scientists
Academics of the University of Glasgow
Academics of Edinburgh Napier University
Fellows of the Royal Society of Edinburgh
Officers of the Order of the British Empire
Living people